Elections to Castlereagh Borough Council were held on 7 June 2001 on the same day as the other Northern Irish local government elections. The election used four district electoral areas to elect a total of 23 councillors.

Election results

Note: "Votes" are the first preference votes.

Districts summary

|- class="unsortable" align="centre"
!rowspan=2 align="left"|Ward
! % 
!Cllrs
! % 
!Cllrs
! %
!Cllrs
! %
!Cllrs
! % 
!Cllrs
! % 
!Cllrs
!rowspan=2|TotalCllrs
|- class="unsortable" align="center"
!colspan=2 bgcolor="" | DUP
!colspan=2 bgcolor="" | UUP
!colspan=2 bgcolor="" | Alliance
!colspan=2 bgcolor="" | SDLP
!colspan=2 bgcolor="" | PUP
!colspan=2 bgcolor="white"| Others
|-
|align="left"|Castlereagh Central
|bgcolor="#D46A4C"|50.4
|bgcolor="#D46A4C"|3
|15.4
|1
|11.5
|1
|6.4
|0
|7.5
|1
|8.8
|0
|6
|-
|align="left"|Castlereagh East
|bgcolor="#D46A4C"|50.2
|bgcolor="#D46A4C"|4
|20.5
|1
|14.4
|1
|0.0
|0
|5.1
|0
|9.8
|1
|7
|-
|align="left"|Castlereagh South
|26.3
|1
|bgcolor="40BFF5"|27.0
|bgcolor="40BFF5"|2
|17.6
|1
|23.6
|1
|0.0
|0
|5.5
|0
|5
|-
|align="left"|Castlereagh West
|bgcolor="#D46A4C"|29.4
|bgcolor="#D46A4C"|2
|25.3
|1
|16.6
|1
|17.5
|1
|4.4
|0
|6.8
|0
|5
|- class="unsortable" class="sortbottom" style="background:#C9C9C9"
|align="left"| Total
|39.4
|10
|22.1
|5
|15.2
|4
|11.4
|2
|4.2
|1
|7.7
|1
|23
|-
|}

Districts results

Castlereagh Central

1997: 4 x DUP, 1 x Alliance, 1 x UUP, 1 x UKUP
2001: 4 x DUP, 1 x Alliance, 1 x UUP, 1 x PUP
1997-2001 Change: PUP gain from UKUP

Castlereagh East

1997: 4 x DUP, 1 x UUP, 1 x Alliance, 1 x Independent Unionist
2001: 4 x DUP, 1 x UUP, 1 x Alliance, 1 x Independent
1997-2001 Change: Independent gain from Independent Unionist

Castlereagh South

1997: 2 x UUP, 1 x DUP, 1 x SDLP, 1 x Alliance
2001: 2 x UUP, 1 x DUP, 1 x SDLP, 1 x Alliance
1997-2001 Change: No change

Castlereagh West

1997: 2 x DUP, 1 x UUP, 1 x SDLP, 1 x Alliance
2001: 2 x DUP, 1 x UUP, 1 x SDLP, 1 x Alliance
1997-2001 Change: No change

References

Castlereagh Borough Council elections
Castlereagh